Nagore Esmail Mohammed Hanifa (25 December 1925 – 8 April 2015) was a Tamil Muslim lyricist, playback singer and politician. He was known as Isai Murasu for his deep stentorian voice.

His signature song was "Iraivanidam Kaiyendungal". It was written by Kiliyanur, (near Mayiladuthurai) R. Abdul Salam. The lyrics are beyond any specific religion. It is liked by not only Muslims but Hindus and Christians, even today sung by many singers on stages.. He is considered one of the greatest and most influential singers of South India and beyond.

Politics and Cinema 
Nagore Hanifa penned many devotional songs independently which are widely used in Tamil Nadu, during festivals and marriages. During the 1950s the songs which he sang for Dravida Munnetra Kazhagam boosted the fortunes of the party. He was also a film playback singer. Iraivanidam Kaiyenthungal is very well known song from him among all the Tamils.

During the 1970s, he was the member of Tamil Nadu Legislative Council, which is defunct now. He died on 8 April 2015, aged 89.

References

Tamil musicians
2015 deaths
1925 births
Members of the Tamil Nadu Legislative Council
20th-century Indian musicians